Keri is a village and a community in the southern part of the island of Zakynthos. It is situated on a hillside, close to the Ionian Sea coast. Its population in 2011 was 469 for the village and 788 for the community, which includes the villages Apelati, Limni Keriou and Marathias. The community includes the island's southernmost point, Cape Marathia. Keri is 6 km south of Lithakia and 15 km southwest of Zakynthos (city). The village suffered great damage from the 1953 Ionian earthquake.

Keri is also famous for nearby Keri cliffs, rising over 300 m from the Ionian Sea. This location is famous for its sunset. A 9-metre tall lighthouse, built in 1925, sits atop the cliffs.

Population

See also
List of settlements in Zakynthos

References

External links

Keri at the GTP Travel Pages
Beaches, Apartments and points of interest in Keri from Travel Zakynthos

Populated places in Zakynthos